The 1898–99 season was the 26th Scottish football season in which Dumbarton competed at national level entering the Scottish Cup and the Scottish Qualifying Cup. In addition Dumbarton played in the Dumbartonshire Cup.

Scottish Qualifying Cup
Since 1895, the smaller clubs required to enter the Scottish Qualifying Cup in order to gain access to the Scottish Cup proper.  This season, for the first time, Dumbarton were required to pre-qualify for the Scottish Cup and did so by reaching the fourth round of the Qualifying Cup before losing out to Renton.

Scottish Cup

Dumbarton's appearance in the Scottish Cup itself was short-lived being knocked out in the first round by East Stirlingshire.

Dumbartonshire Cup
Dumbarton continued to dominate the local scene by retaining the Dumbartonshire Cup, beating Vale of Leven in a two-legged semi final then Renton in the final.

Friendlies
For a second season Dumbarton were without league fixtures, and the task of building a fixture list with attractive opponents was becoming more difficult.

During the season, 15 'friendly' matches were played, including close defeats home and away against Celtic, and fixtures against Ayrshire Cup holders, Kilmarnock, Lanarkshire Cup holders, Airdrie and Perthshire Cup holders, Fair City Athletic, in the latter case to open Fair City's new ground.  In all, 6 were won and 9 lost, scoring 45 goals and conceding 45.

Player statistics
The lack of league participation continued to take a toll on the players willing to serve the club and, amongst others, John Docherty, James Richmond and internationalist William Thomson left the club to join Celtic, Partick Thistle and Clyde respectively.

|}

Source:

Reserve team
Dumbarton lost in the second round of the Scottish Second XI Cup to Rangers.

References

Dumbarton F.C. seasons
Scottish football clubs 1898–99 season